Lorenz Adolf Schönberger (1768, Bad Vöslau - 10 August 1846/47, Mainz) was an Austrian landscape painter and engraver, in the style of Claude Lorrain.

Life and work 
His father was the Head Chef for Baron Johann von Fries. He received his artistic training at the Academy of Fine Arts, Vienna, where his primary instructor was Michael Wutky.

After completing his education he became and, for much of his life, remained a traveler throughout Central and Western Europe. He was in Paris (1804), Frankfurt (1810), various locations in Italy (mostly Rome) from 1817 to 1825, the Netherlands (1826), England (1830) and back to Rome by 1840. In between, he always returned to Vienna, which he considered to be his home town. While in Amsterdam, he was named a member of the Koninklijke Akademie van Beeldende Kunsten. 

He was married twice; first to Marianne Marconi (1785-1882), an opera singer. They soon parted, but she carried his name (as Schönberger-Marconi) throughout her career. Later, he married into the old noble family of Hundbiß von Waltrams from Swabia. His son, Adolf von Schönberger (1804–1880), became a General in the Austrian Cavalry and was ennobled for his military achievements.

References

Further reading 
 Biography from the Biographisches Lexikon des Kaiserthums Oesterreich @ WikiSource.

External links 

 Engravings by Schönberger @ the Philadelphia Museum of Art

1768 births
1846 deaths
Austrian painters
Austrian landscape painters
Academy of Fine Arts Vienna alumni